Dževdet Mustagrudić - Deta (Podgorica, Kingdom of Yugoslavia, 1923 – Pazarić, Independent State of Croatia, 1944) was a footballer and member of Yugoslav partisans. Podgorica, now in Montenegro, named a street after him on 8 June 2017.

Biography
He started playing at 15 years old in 1937 for GSK Balšić Podgorica. With capitulation of Yugoslavia, he and his family moved to Sarajevo in 1941. He started playing for Đerzelez which competed in Croatian First League. He was best player for Đerzelez at that time. In season 1943 he scored 26 goals. He was scheduled to travel to Zagreb, capital of Independent State of Croatia, a fascist puppet state of Germany, and sign for HŠK Građanski, but he instead chose to enter League of Communist Youth of Yugoslavia. He escaped Sarajevo in September 1944, where he joined partisans on mountain Igman. He died some 7 days later, in Pazarić, nearby Sarajevo, after attacking one German bunker.

Prior to his death in action by Germans, it was planned that he would be transferred to Yugoslav partisans based in Italy, where Hajduk was stationed as well, so that he could join the club.

References

1923 births
1944 deaths
Yugoslav Partisans members
Footballers from Podgorica
Footballers from Sarajevo
Military personnel from Podgorica
Yugoslav military personnel killed in World War II